Pre-mRNA-processing factor 40 homolog B is a protein that in humans that is encoded by the PRPF40B gene.

References

Further reading